Line 2 of Foshan Metro (FMetro) is a metro line in Foshan. It runs in a south-west direction, connecting Guangzhou South Railway Station and Nanzhuang. It  opened on 28 December 2021.

Stations

Notes

References

Foshan Metro lines
2021 establishments in China
Railway lines opened in 2021